Cathy Spatz Widom is a psychologist and professor known for her research in the fields of early childhood abuse and neglect. She has received the AAAS Prize for Behavioral Science Research in 1989, the Edwin H. Sutherland Award in 2013, and the Stockholm Prize in Criminology in 2016. She was co-editor of the Journal of Quantitative Criminology from 2010 to 2013. Widom has conducted research to determine the long term consequences of early childhood physical and sexual abuse and child neglect.

Biography 
Cathy Spatz Widom received her Bachelor of Arts degree in child development and family relationships at Cornell University in Ithaca, NY. She went to pursue her Master and Ph.D degrees in psychology at Brandeis University. She is currently Distinguished Professor of Psychology at John Jay College of Criminal Justice, CUNY.  Widom's primary focus is on the long-term consequences of child abuse and neglect, and area in which she has published numerous papers on the cycle of violence. She is a fellow of the three divisions of American Psychological Association (Division 41 - Psychology and Law, Division 43 – Society for Family Psychology, and Division 37 – Child and Family Policy and Practice), the American Psychopathological Association, and the American Society of Criminology.  Widom's research has been supported by grants from the National Institute of Justice, National Institute of Mental Health, and NIDA.

Research 
Widom is known for her research pertaining to early childhood abuse (physical and sexual) and neglect in relation to later adversity, such as post-traumatic stress disorder, major depressive disorder, teenage pregnancy, intimate partner violence, prostitution, and exposure to HIV and other sexually transmitted diseases. She collected one of the only longitudinal datasets in the world on child abuse and neglect; throughout her career she has developed innovative methodologies, most recently adding biological markers to understanding pathways linking early abuse and neglect to adult outcomes. Recently, she published her second paper in Science on the intergenerational transmission of child abuse and neglect.

Representative publications 
Gilbert, R., Widom, C. S., Browne, K., Fergusson, D., Webb, E., & Janson, S. (2009). Burden and consequences of child maltreatment in high-income countries. The Lancet, 373(9657), 68–81.
Widom, C. S. (1989). The cycle of violence. Science, 244(4901), 160–166.
Widom, C. S. (1999). Posttraumatic stress disorder in abused and neglected children grown up. American Journal of Psychiatry, 156(8), 1223–1229.
Widom, C. S., DuMont, K., & Czaja, S. J. (2007). A prospective investigation of major depressive disorder and comorbidity in abused and neglected children grown up. Archives of General Psychiatry, 64(1), 49–56.
Wilson, H. W., & Widom, C. S. (2011). Pathways from childhood abuse and neglect to HIV-risk sexual behavior in middle adulthood. Journal of Consulting and Clinical Psychology, 79(2), 236–246.

References

External links 
 Faculty Home Page
 

Year of birth missing (living people)
Living people
American women psychologists
21st-century American psychologists
City University of New York faculty
Cornell University alumni
Brandeis University alumni
Winners of the Stockholm Prize in Criminology